The Seal & Serpent Society is a house club located at Cornell University. Founded in 1905, the Society is one of the oldest at the university. The Tudor mansion at 305 Thurston Avenue has housed the active chapter since 1927.

Seal and Serpent operates as a social club rather than a secret society or final club. At the time of its founding, many house clubs and societies in the Ivy League had similar names, such as the extant Skull and Bones, Casque and Gauntlet, and Quill and Dagger. The Great Depression took a considerable toll on the membership and financial solvency of extracurricular collegiate organizations, and many were forced to disband. As the Greek system expanded and incorporated many other societies, Seal and Serpent maintained its independence as a member of Cornell's Interfraternity Council (IFC) which oversees the university's entire fraternity system. In the fall of 2016, the active chapter voted to terminate its membership in the Cornell Interfraternity Council, becoming an independent student organization. 

As of Fall, 2020, the active chapter and alumni board voted to become gender neutral.

Early history

Seal and Serpent Society has its origins in the coalescence of two Cornell undergraduate groups; the "Crooks' Club" and the "Senators." The ten original members began to meet in the fall of 1905 with the intent of preserving the traditions of Cornell student life. They called themselves the Society of the Seal and Serpent, and made plans to take a house together in the fall and elect their first officers." Alvin Ward "Gub" King '07 was elected president as a sort of coalition man not involved too much with either of the two original groups.

World War I era 
The house has had a long tradition of military history.

In 1917, World War I dramatically impacted student life in Ithaca, and the landscape of the entire Cornell community changed. The Lodge did not yet exist, and Society's Board of Directors offered the University the use of the West Avenue house as a ROTC barracks.

Cornell commissioned 4,598 officers in the Great War; more than half of the 9,000 total Cornellians enlisted. Seal and Serpent lost three men during the War: Joseph Mason ’13, Frank McCullough ’20, and Edward Ilsley Tinkham ’16. In March 1917, Tinkham organized the first unit of Cornell men. A varsity athlete and known figure at Cornell, en route to France one of his classmates wrote of him: "'Ed' Tinkham. is the recognized leader of the unit and whatever he says goes. No one could be more devoted to our welfare and there is something about the quiet way he handles things and looks after us that makes everyone love and respect him."

Under Captain Edward I Tinkham ’16, members of the American Expeditionary Forces were the first Americans to carry the Stars and Stripes into Europe at the start of the Great War. 264 Cornellians died in World War I; Captain Tinkham died of tuberculosis while in Italy. For his service, Tinkham earned the Italian War Cross and Port Corsini in 1918, and the US Navy Cross thereafter.

The Great Depression era 
After World War I, the impact of the Great Depression on college campuses was severe. The vast majority of independent social clubs were purchased by national chapters, and universities purchased the property where many fraternities now reside. Seal and Serpent was one of two fraternities at Cornell that had the resources to remain independent, the other house converting to a national fraternity shortly after the Depression ended. Today, Seal and Serpent is the only independent social society at Cornell University.

Modern era 
Participation as a local men's society within the Cornell Interfraternity Council continued until the Fall of 2016 when the active chapter voted to terminate its membership in the IFC, becoming a fully independent student organization. 

In the fall of 2020, Seal and Serpent's active chapter and alumni board voted to become coed.

The Lodge

The Seal and Serpent home is located at 305 Thurston Avenue. The earliest members of the Society purchased the land in 1913, but the building of the Lodge was delayed by the demands of World War I. Construction finally began in 1926, and the Lodge was formally dedicated and presented to the Active Chapter on October 22, 1927. Over 1,250 members have lived there.

In film
In 2010, Seal & Serpent was featured in the A&E Network TV show "Strange Days with Bob Saget" in an episode exploring Ivy League fraternity life.

Original Snakes

 Stanhope Eccleston Blunt, '09
 George "Gus" Ruhlen Jr., '07
 Benjamin "Stuzzie" Stuart McConnell, '08
 Alfred "Shep" William Shepherd, '07
 Carrollton "Twig" Crawford Sprigg, '07
 Albert "Bert" Church Blunt Jr., '07
 Romeo "Romey" Benvenuto Kuehns, '07
 Earl "Zim" William Zimmerman, '07
 Alvin "Gub" Ward King, '07
 Harold "Monie" Mead McConnell, '07

Not Pictured:
 William Henry McCaully '08
 Charles “Dickie” Chester Byron Dickson ’08
 Frederic "Fritz" Sanford Sly, '07

Notable alumni

 Robert Cunjak, – Managing Director, Bain Capital, LLC
 Mark Kirk – United States Senator from Illinois 
 Martin Tang – Retired Chairman, Asia at Spencer Stuart & Associates; 112th President of the MIT Alumni Association; Cornell University Trustee Emeritus and Presidential Councillor; Trustee of the Institute of International Education 
 Gligor Tashkovich – Minister of Foreign Investment, Republic of Macedonia (2006–2008); Council on Foreign Relations (1999–2004)
 Edward Isley Tinkham – Captain, United States Army (World War I)
J. Christopher Racich - President, Vestigant, LLC

References

External links
 
 Cornell OFSA Site

Cornell University student organizations

Student organizations established in 1905
1905 establishments in New York (state)